The page lists Australian association football clubs whose men's sides have won competitive honours run by official governing bodies. Friendly competitions and matches organized between clubs are not included. The football associations FIFA, AFC and OFC run international, Asian and Oceania competitions; while Football Australia, and its mostly self-governing subsidiary bodies the National Soccer League and A-League Men, run national competitions.

Summary totals
Numbers in bold are record totals for that category. Clubs in italics are Double winners: they have won two or more of these trophies in the same season (excluding super cups). Clubs tied in total honours are listed chronologically by most recent honour won. See the other tables for breakdowns of each competition won.

Cups here are competitions with a knockout format. Among FIFA, AFC and OFC competitions, these are the AFC Champions League, the OFC Champions League, the Oceania Cup Winners' Cup, the FIFA Club World Cup, and the Pan-Pacific Championship. Among top-qualifying competitions overseen by FA, these are the Australia Cup, the Australia Cup (1962–1968), NSL Cup and the A-League Pre-Season Challenge Cup. Super cups here consist of the honours that have or had only two participating clubs per season. This is only the Oceania Cup Winners' Cup.

Last updated on 1 October 2022, following the 2022 Australia Cup Final

FIFA, AFC and OFC

Winners of each competition are referenced above. Numbers in bold are Australian record totals for that competition. Trophies that were shared between two clubs are counted as honours for both teams. Clubs tied in total honours are listed chronologically by most recent honour won.

Last updated 1 November 2014.

FA, NSL and ALM (top-qualifying)
This section only lists competitions overseen by The FA (and its subsidiary leagues the NSL and A-League Men) where there are no higher competitions clubs could participate in instead. See the next section for other competitions run by these bodies.

Winners of each competition are referenced above. Numbers in bold are record totals for that competition. Clubs in italics are Double winners: they have won two or more of the top division and the Australia Cup, in the same season. Clubs tied in total honours are listed chronologically by most recent honour won.

Last updated on 1 October 2022.

See also

 List of Australian soccer champions

References

External links
 

Australian soccer club statistics
honours
Soccer in Australia